Anastasiia Viktorivna Bryzhina (born 9 January 1998) is a Ukrainian sprinter. She competed in the women's 400 metres at the 2017 World Championships in Athletics. She competed in the women's 4 × 400 metres relay at the 2018 IAAF World Indoor Championships.

Bryzhina is the daughter of the successful Soviet athletes Olga Bryzhina and Viktor Bryzhin, and sister of Yelyzaveta Bryzhina.

References

External links
 

1998 births
Living people
Ukrainian female sprinters
World Athletics Championships athletes for Ukraine
Place of birth missing (living people)